Langsning SC is an Indian professional football club based in Shillong, Meghalaya. The club competes in Shillong Premier League and has previously competed in I-League 2nd Division, then second tier of football in India.

History
Langsning SC is a Khasi football club; the name "Langsning" is taken from one locality in Shillong known as Jaiaw Langsning, and most of the players are from this or neighbouring localities. The club won the Shillong Premier League in 2017.

Langsning SC had played in the 2011, 2012 and 2013 seasons of I-League 2nd Division. The club failed to advance beyond group stage in 2011 and 2012. Langsning FC's best performance so far came in 2013, where they finished fourth.

After four years, Langsning SC competed again in 2017–18 I-League 2nd Division.

Team records

Seasons

Honours
 Shillong Premier League
Champions (6): 1997, 1999, 2000, 2005, 2017, 2018
Bordoloi Trophy
Runners-up (1): 2011
Independence Day Cup
Champions (1): 2012

References

External links
 Langsning F.C. at Soccerway

Multi-sport clubs in India
Football clubs in Meghalaya
Association football clubs established in 1974
1974 establishments in Meghalaya
Sport in Shillong
I-League 2nd Division clubs